Roman Shumunov (born 1984) is an Israeli film director and screenwriter.

Biography
Roman Shumunov was born in Tbilisi, Georgia in 1984. In 1993,  after the Russia-Georgia War, his family moved to Russia. In 2001 he immigrated to Israel at the age of 17 as part of the students' preparation program Selah mir  and was trained at the University of Tel-Aviv. In 2004 he enlisted in the Israeli Air Force. During 2008-2011 he graduated with honors from the Sapir Academic College. In a number of his films Shumunow attempts to raise the awareness of the life of young immigrants to Israel. In his interview to a Russophone TV program "Day" of Channel 9 Shumunov says that the three films, No One But Us,  Babylon Dreamers, and Here and Now are a kind of a trilogy, an evolution of the same idea.

Filmography
2011: No One But Us, short, 35 min, diploma work.
2012: Eyes, short
2015: Red Echoes of War
2016: Babylon Dreamers, documentary, 90 min.
Summary: A breakdancing team formed by immigrants from the former Soviet Union in a poor neighborhood in Israel plan  competing in the International Breakdancing Competition in Germany. 
2018: Here and Now, full feature film debut 
Summary: A social drama evolving around a rap band of young immigrants from the former Soviet Union  who live in the poor neighborhood of Ashdod and are rehearsing for auditions for an international music festival.
2020: Back to Chernobyl, documentary
2021: , drama film
2022 ,; English-language version: Memory Forest, a  TV series in four 34 minute parts aired by Kan Educational about a group of Israeli teenagers on an educational trip to Poland to gain an experience about the Holocaust.
2022: One and a Half Generation, TV mini series produced by Kan 11.

Awards
No one but us
2012: Best Short Film, at the Mexico International Film Festival. 
2012: Best Actor Award and Honorable Mention Prize: Haifa International Film Festival.
2011: Best Original Music, Cinema South Film Festival, Israel.
Babylon Dreamers
2016:  Best debut film, at the DocAviv, Tel-Aviv International Documentary Film Festival 
Jury Rationale: "The best debut prize is given to Roman Shumunov, a young filmmaker who brings his great rebel spirit to his film Babylon Dreamers. His fresh approach in portraying a group of tough and sensitive breakdancers opens up a window of hope and new possibilities for underground culture." 
2017: Best Documentary Film Award: KIFF Kiev International Film Festival, Ukraine
2017: Best First Film Award at 
2017: Audience Award for Best Film at the Moscow International Documentary Film Festival
2018:  Winner in section "We are changing" "(Mi változunk)" at the 
Here and Now
2015,  At the project stage, under the tentative title No Future, the film won the Jerusalem Film Festival Pitch Point’s Van Leer Foundation Award. Jury's opinion: "The film has the potential to be a unique, sensitive and authentic voice of an important ethnic group in Israel"
2018, Best Music Award and the Ophir Awards
2019, Best Screenplay Award Zabaikalsky International Film Festival.
Berenshtein - The Last Partisan
2022, Best Feature Film Award at Montreal Israeli Film Festival. 
2022, Best Director Award at Montreal Israeli Film Festival.

References

External links
Shumunov's website

1984 births
Living people
Israeli film directors
Israeli male screenwriters
Sapir Academic College alumni